Lesotho Defence Force FC is a Lesotho football club based in Maseru. It is based in the city of Maseru in the Maseru District.

The team currently plays in Lesotho Premier League.

Stadium
Currently the team plays at the 1,000 capacity Ratjomose Stadium.

References

External links
Soccerway

Lesotho Premier League clubs
Military association football clubs
Military of Lesotho
Organisations based in Maseru